San Giovanni Nuovo (also known as San Zan Novo or San Zaninovo) is a Roman Catholic church in the campo of the same name, in the sestiere of Castello.

History
A church at the site was present by the 10th century, but the façade, which remains mostly incomplete, was rebuilt in 1762 using designs by Matteo Lucchesi.

The interior has a nave defined by corinthian columns. There are two lateral chapels. The main altar has a canvas depicting St John Evangelist Martyred by boiling in cauldron of oil by Francesco Maggiotto. It is flanked by two smaller paintings, a Sacrifice of Abraham and of Melchisedech, painted by Fabio Canal. In the second lateral chapel is a 14th-century polychrome wood crucifix. The bell-tower dates from the earlier church.

Bibliography
 Giulio Lorenzetti, Venezia e il suo estuario, ristampa 1974, Edizioni Lint Trieste, pag. 320.
Derived from Italian Wikipedia entry.

Roman Catholic churches in Venice
Roman Catholic churches completed in 1762
10th-century churches in Italy
18th-century Roman Catholic church buildings in Italy